The Union of Arras (Dutch: Unie van Atrecht, French: Union d'Arras, Spanish: Unión de Arrás) was an alliance between the County of Artois, the County of Hainaut and the city of Douai in the Habsburg Netherlands in early 1579 during the Eighty Years' War. Dissatisfied with the religious policies of rebel leader Prince of Orange and the States General of the Netherlands, and especially the rise of the radical Calvinist Republic of Ghent since October 1577, they signed a declaration on 6 January 1579 about their intent to offer a vigorous defense of the Roman Catholic religion against what they saw as encroachments by Calvinists in other provinces. These signatories would begin negotiations for a separate peace with the Spanish Crown, which resulted in the Treaty of Arras of 17 May 1579.

Background

After the Pacification of Ghent, the entire Habsburg Netherlands was united in opposition to the government of king Philip II of Spain, the overlord of the Netherlands. They formed the Union of Brussels that constituted a formal government, formed by the States General and a governor-general who was appointed by the States General: the archduke Matthias, in competition with the royal governor-general, Don Juan of Austria. Orange, the leader of the originally rebelling provinces, Holland and Zeeland, had a leading role in the Council of State that formed the executive for the States General. One of the important provisions of the Pacification was that the Calvinists received freedom of religion in Holland and Zeeland, and would be tolerated elsewhere in the Netherlands, but that the other 15 provinces would officially maintain the Catholic Church as the dominant one. Calvinists in other provinces soon also claimed freedom of religion. In Flanders and Brabant they even used force to change the government of cities like Ghent, Bruges, and Antwerp to obtain this objective, much to the dismay of Catholic politicians in the southern part of the country. Orange tried to promote civil peace with a policy of "religious peace," allowing freedom of worship to both Catholics and Protestants in the entire Netherlands.

Declaration of 6 January 1579
Don Juan died in October 1578 and was replaced as commander of the Spanish Army of Flanders and royal governor-general by Alexander Farnese, Duke of Parma, who proved an able diplomat, adept at driving wedges between the Catholic nobles in the south and the regime of Orange and the States General. In opposition to the policies of Orange a group of Catholic nobles, known in historiography by the name "Malcontents," had formed under the leadership of the stadtholder of Hainaut, Philip de Lalaing, 3rd Count of Lalaing and Emanuel Philibert de Lalaing. Parma opened negotiations with the Malcontents and they brought about an alliance of Hainaut, Artois, and the city of Douai, which on 6 January 1579 subscribed to a declaration in which they expressed their discontent about the events since the Pacification of Ghent, and (without naming names) rejected the "religious peace" policy of Orange. The declaration issued in the following rousing promise: 

Beyond this promise the declaration did not contain more concrete resolutions, such as the formation of a defensive alliance, like a number of the northern provinces formed later in January 1579 in the form of the Union of Utrecht. But this was not to be expected, as the signers of the declaration considered themselves the "true" defenders of the Union of Brussels, that they intended to continue.

Peace of Arras

However, the members of the Union of Arras soon opened peace negotiations with Parma, which resulted in the signing of the Treaty of Arras (1579) on 17 May 1579. 
These were the main conditions:
 The provisions of the Pacification of Ghent, the Perpetual Edict and the Union of Brussels were reaffirmed, both by the Spanish Crown and the members of the Union of Arras;
 There should be no more garrisons of foreign mercenary troops, either paid by Spain or by the States General;
 The Council of State should be organized like that of the time of Charles V;
 Two-thirds of the council members should be installed by all States of the member provinces consenting;
 All privileges that were in force at the time of the reign of Charles V should be reinstated;
 Taxes imposed after the reign of Charles V were to be abolished;
 Roman Catholicism was the only allowed religion. Any other religion (i.e. Calvinism) should be prohibited.

The provinces that signed the Peace were:

 County of Hainaut
 County of Artois
 Lille, Douai and Orchies (Walloon Flanders)

The regions that favored the Peace, but did not sign it at time (though they later acceded), were 
 County of Namur, 
 County of Luxembourg, 
 Duchy of Limburg.

Parma used these "reconciled" counties as a base to start his reconquest of the "disobedient" provinces (members of the Union of Utrecht).

See also
 Union of Utrecht

Notes and references

Notes

References

Sources

1579 in the Habsburg Netherlands
Former polities in the Netherlands
Atrecht
Eighty Years' War (1566–1609)
1579 treaties
Arras